The Grampian 30 is a Canadian sailboat, that was designed by Alex McGruer and first built in 1969.

Production
The design was built by Grampian Marine in Canada between 1969 and 1977, with a total of 400 examples completed. The design is now out of production.

Design

The Grampian 30 is a small recreational keelboat, built predominantly of fiberglass, with wood trim. It has a masthead sloop rig, a raked stem, a reverse transom and an internally-mounted spade-type rudder controlled by a wheel. It may be fitted with a fixed fin keel or, optionally a centreboard and stub keel. It displaces  and carries  of ballast.

A tall mast version was also produced that has a mast about  higher.

The boat is fitted with a Universal Atomic 4 gasoline engine.

The centreboard version has a PHRF racing average handicap of 201 with a high of 180 and low of 216. The tall mast model has a PHRF racing average handicap of 195 with a high of 186 and low of 207.

Operational history
A Grampian 30 was run aground off Cape Hatteras in a severe storm. The crew remained on board while the boat was laid on its side for four hours as they had no escape in the storm. After the storm had abated and the tide went out, the boat was left high and dry. When the tide came back in the boat was floated off the shore. Back in port the only damage found was bent keel bolts.

In a review Michael McGoldrick wrote, "Regardless of their size category, the various Grampian models have one thing in common - they offer a lot of boat for relatively little money... Some people find that it isn't the sleekest looking sailboat, and that its appearance may be a little dated, but the Grampian 30 is very much a modern 30 foot production fiberglass sailboat of the 1970s. While it has been suggested that this model doesn't quite live up to the Grampian 26's reputation as a good sailing boat, it does have a nice interior layout with loads of room."

See also
List of sailing boat types

Similar sailboats
Alberg 30
Alberg Odyssey 30
Aloha 30
Annie 30
Bahama 30
Bristol 29.9
C&C 1/2 Ton
C&C 30
C&C 30 Redwing
Catalina 30
Catalina 309
CS 30
Hunter 30
Hunter 30T
Hunter 30-2
Hunter 306
J/30
Kirby 30
Leigh 30
Mirage 30
Mirage 30 SX
Nonsuch 30
O'Day 30
Pearson 303
S2 9.2
Seafarer 30
Southern Cross 28
Tanzer 31

References

External links

Keelboats
1960s sailboat type designs
Sailing yachts
Sailboat type designs by Alex McGruer
Sailboat types built by Grampian Marine